Sceloporus zosteromus, the central Baja spiny lizard or Monserrat Island spiny lizard, is a species of lizard in the family Phrynosomatidae. It is endemic to Mexico.

References

Sceloporus
Reptiles of Mexico
Reptiles described in 1863
Taxa named by Edward Drinker Cope